Mantralaya Mahatme is a 1966 Indian Kannada-language film directed by T. V. Singh Thakur, based on the book Sri Raghavendra Vijaya written by Rajaguru Rajacharya, and stars Rajkumar in the role of Raghavendra Swami, a Hindu saint who lived in the 17th century India. Udaykumar, Jayanthi and Kalpana appear in pivotal roles in the film. Dorai–Bhagavan were extensively involved in the production and direction department of this movie. The film is being colorised in wide-screen and set to release in 2022.

Cast 
 Rajkumar as Raghavendra Swami

 Jayanthi as Saraswathi
 Kalpana as Tulasi
 Udaykumar as Thimmanna Bhat
 Ramesh
 H. R. Shastry
 A. V. Seshagiri Rao
 Advani Lakshmi Devi
 M. Jayashree
 B. Jaya

Production
In an interview, S. K. Bhagawan says that for the film Rajkumar was on a 43 day strict diet he also walked 18000 m without wearing a chappal.

Soundtrack 
The music of the film was composed by the duo Rajan–Nagendra with lyrics for the soundtrack penned by G. V. Iyer. The song "Indu Enage Govinda" was taken from Raghavendra Swami's works.

References 

1966 films
1960s Kannada-language films
Hindu devotional films
Films scored by Rajan–Nagendra